The PT Mi-U is a circular Czech anti-tank mine with a Misznay Schardin effect warhead. It can be used with a conventional pressure fuze or a tilt rod fuze. 

The mine can be used with an electronic fuze with an adjustable electronic arming delay, self neutralization period, and self-destruct period.

Specifications
 Diameter: 317 mm
 Height: 120 mm
 Weight: 9.41 kg
 Explosive content: 7.11 kg of TNT
 Operating pressure: tilt rod or pressure

References
 Jane's Mines and Mine Clearance 2005-2006
 

Anti-tank mines